Valancourt Books is an independent American publishing house founded by James Jenkins and Ryan Cagle in 2005. The company specializes in "the rediscovery of rare, neglected, and out-of-print fiction," in particular gay titles and Gothic and horror novels from the 18th century to the 1980s.

Overview
Discovering that many works of Gothic fiction from the late 18th and early 19th centuries were unavailable in print, Jenkins and Cagle founded Valancourt in 2005 and began reprinting some of them. Their list includes the "Northanger 'horrid' novels", seven gothic novels lampooned by Jane Austen in Northanger Abbey (1818) and once thought to be fictional titles of Austen's creation.

Eventually the company "expanded into neglected Victorian-era popular fiction, including old penny dreadfuls and sensation novels, as well as a lot of the decadent and fin de siècle literature of the 1890s."

In 2012, Jenkins and Cagle realized that there was 20th century literature as recent as the 1970s or 1980s that was equally difficult to find, and began republishing such modern works, in particular those of gay interest or in the horror/supernatural genre. Valancourt has reprinted many works last published in the 1980s by the now-defunct Gay Men's Press in their Gay Modern Classics series.

Valancourt's reprint editions all have new introductions either by the original authors or by "leading writers or critics."

Notable titles

References

External links
 

Book publishing companies of the United States
LGBT book publishing companies
Publishing companies established in 2005
Small press publishing companies